Lucas Oil Speedway is a motorsports racing facility located at the intersection of U.S. Route 54 and Missouri Route 83, in Wheatland, Missouri, United States. Its primary circuit is a dirt track banked oval motorsport race track. Co-located at the site of the speedway is Lucas Lake, a motorboat racing venue, the first purpose-built boat drag racing lake in the world, located across from the track.

History
Lucas Oil Speedway was originally built as the Wheatland Raceway, in 2001, as a 3/8-mile dirt track in a former agricultural field, by Ron and Mary Jenkins of Wheatland. It was purchased by Lucas Oil in 2004, and then was rebuilt. In 2006, after the conversion renovation, the track reopened as the Lucas Oil Speedway, with new visitor, VIP, and competitor, and track facilities.

An artificial lake, Lucas Lake was added to host drag boats and motorboat circuit racing. The boating facility was completed in 2011. With its opening, it became the world's first artificial lake for drag boat racing.

An offroad supercross-motocross-style track was added to host off-road dirt buggy racing. The construction was started in 2016 and completed by 2017, with inaugural events in 2017. Racing on the track includes offroad trucks, offroad buggies, motocross bikes. As of 2017, it is the only one of its type in southwest Missouri.

Speedway Dirt Oval
Wheatland Raceway or Lucas Oil Speedway (aka The Diamond of Dirt Tracks) is a  semi-banked oval with a clay surface. The interior of the oval is capable of holding  if it were watertight.

Offroad dirt track
The Lucas Oil Off Road Racing Series held races on the circuit from 2015 until the series folded after the 2020 season (and it was on the tentative 2021 schedule. The May 21, 2019 event was cancelled after severe weather caused some damage to the facility.

Racing boat facility
Lucas Lake, the artificial lake includes a drag boat course for drag racing race boats. It is the world's first artificial lake built for drag boat racing.

References

External links
Official website

Speedway
Motorsport venues in Missouri
Lucas Lake
Lucas Lake